Everything is True is a solo album by Australian singer–songwriter Paul Dempsey. Dempsey, who rose to fame with his band Something For Kate, played every instrument that appears on the album.

At the J Awards of 2009, the album was nominated for Australian Album of the Year.

Background
Dempsey has revealed that he was initially reluctant to record the album, but was encouraged by his two other bandmates from Something For Kate. Clint Hindman, the drummer, had opened a bar in his hometown of Melbourne, Australia, and bassist, Stephanie Ashworth, was exploring other pursuits such as photography while Dempsey worked on the album.

Track listing
 "Bats"
 "Fast Friends"
 "Out of the Airlock"
 "Ramona Was a Waitress"
 "Take Us to Your Leader"
 "Bird in a Basement"
 "Theme from Nice Guy"
 "Have You Fallen Out of Love?"
 "The Great Optimist"
 "Safety in Numbness"
 "Man of the Moment"

Charts

Certifications

References

2009 debut albums
EMI Records albums
Paul Dempsey albums